Johnny is an English language personal name. It is usually an affectionate diminutive of the masculine given name John, but from the 16th century it has sometimes been a given name in its own right for males and, less commonly, females.

Variant forms of Johnny include Johnnie, Johnney, Johnni and Johni.

Notable people and characters named Johnny or Johnnie include:

People

Johnny
 Johnny Adams (born 1932), American singer
 Johnny Aba (born 1956), Papua New Guinean professional boxer
 Johnny Abarrientos (born 1970), Filipino professional basketball player
 Johnny Abbes García (1924–1967), chief of the government intelligence office of the Dominican Republic
 Johnny Abel (1947–1995), Canadian politician
 Johnny Abrego (born 1962), former Major League baseball player
 Johnny Ace (1929–1954), American rhythm and blues singer
 John Laurinaitis, (born 1962) also known as Johnny Ace, American wrestler and producer
 Johnny Adair (born 1963), loyalist paramilitary leader in Northern Ireland
 John "Johnny" Adriano Acea (1917–1963), American jazz pianist
 Johnny Anfone (born 1969), Thai actor, singer and model
 Johnny Appleseed (1774–1845), American pioneer nurseryman
 Johnny Archer (born 1968), American pool player
 Johnny Bench (born 1947), American baseball player
 Johnny Yong Bosch (born 1976), actor and martial artist
 Johnny Boychuk (born 1984), Canadian ice hockey player
 Johnny Bristol (1939–2004), American musician
 Johnny Burke (lyricist) (1908–1964), American lyricist
 Johnny Cardoso (born 2001), American soccer player
 Johnny Carson (1925–2005), American talk show host
 Johnny Cash (1932–2003), American singer-songwriter and actor
 Johnny Chakravarthy, Indian actor
 Johnny Cochrane, Scottish football manager
 Johnny Cook (Canadian football) (1925–1986), American football player
 Johnny Crawford (1946–2021), American actor, singer and musician
 Johnny Davis (born 1962), American kickboxer
 Johnny Depp (born 1963), American actor, film producer, and musician
 Johnny Diaz, American writer
 Johnny Flynn, British musician, singer-songwriter and actor
 Johnny Galecki (born 1975), American actor
Johnny Gargano (born 1987), American professional wrestler
 Johnny Gaudreau (born 1993), American ice hockey player
 Johnny Gilbert (born 1924), American TV personality
 Johnny Gioeli (born 1967), American singer-songwriter
 Johnny Hallyday (1943–2017), French singer and actor
 Johnny Hon (born 1971), Hong Kong businessman and politician
 Johnny Hooker (born 1987), Brazilian rock/MPB musician
 Johnny Huggins (born 1976), American football player
 Johnny Johnson (disambiguation), multiple people
 Johnny Karras (1928–2008), American football player
 Johnny Kemp (1959–2015), Bahamian musician
 Johnny Kitagawa (1931–2019), Japanese-American businessman and talent manager
 Johnny Knoxville (born 1971), American actor, daredevil, comedian, screenwriter and film producer
 Johnny Lee (actor) (1898–1965), American actor
 Johnny Lee (singer) (born 1946), American country music singer
 Johnny Lewis (1983–2012), American actor
 Johnny Lozada (born 1967), Puerto Rican singer, show host and actor
 Johnny Manziel (born 1992), American football player
 Johnny Marr (born 1963), English musician, songwriter, and singer
 Johnny Mathis (born 1935), American singer
 Johnny Maxey (born 1993), American football player
 Johnny Mercer (1909–1976), American lyricist, songwriter and singer
 Johnny Moeller (born 1970), American guitarist
 Johnny Moyal (born 1965), Israeli Olympic gymnast
 Johnny Nash (1940–2020), American singer-songwriter
 Johnny Naumu (19191982), American football player
 Johnny Owen (1956-1980), Welsh boxer
 Johnny Pacar (born 1981), American actor
 Johnny Ace Palmer, American close-up magician
 Johnny Papalia (1924–1997), Canadian fugitive who was murdered
 Johnny Patterson (racing driver) (died 1969), NASCAR driver
 Johnny Peacock (1910–1981), American baseball player
 Johnny Peacock (American football) (born 1947), American football player
 Johnny Pemberton (born 1981), American actor and comedian
 Johnny Reed McKinzie Jr. (born 1985), better known by his stage name Jay Rock, American rapper and songwriter
 Johnny Ringo (1850–1882), American gunfighter and fugitive who was murdered
 Johnny Rivers (born 1942), American singer, songwriter, guitarist, and record producer
 Johnny Roeg (1910–2003), Dutch footballer, striker for Ajax
 Johnny Rotten (born 1956), alias of John Lydon, English lead singer of the Sex Pistols
 Johnny Sequoyah (born 2002), American actress
 Johnny Simmons (born 1986), American actor
 Johnny Sims (born 1967), American football player
 Johnny Sins (born 1978), American pornographic actor 
 Johnny Stanton (born 1994), American football player
 Johnnie To (born 1955), Hong Kong film director, screenwriter and film producer
 Johnny Townsend (American football) (born 1995), American football player
 Johnny Unitas (1933–2002), American football player
 Johnny Weir (born 1984), American figure skater
 Johnny Winter (1944–2014), American blues guitarist, singer, and record producer
 Johnny Whitaker (born 1959), American actor
 Johnny Whitworth (born 1975), American actor

Johnnie
 Johnnie Carr (1911–2008), American civil rights leader
 Johnnie Cochran (1937–2005), American lawyer known for defending O. J. Simpson at his murder trial
 Johnnie Bryan Hunt (1927–2006), American entrepreneur in the trucking industry
 Johnnie Johnson (disambiguation), multiple people
 Johnnie Lewis (1946–2015), Liberian lawyer and politician, 18th Chief Justice of Liberia
 Johnnie Mae Young (1923–2014), full name of professional wrestler Mae Young
 Johnnie Walker (disambiguation), also includes Johnny and Jonny Walkers
 Johnnie Wright (1914–2011), American country music singer and songwriter, half of the duo Johnnie & Jack

Fictional characters
 Johnny, a recurring character in the video game series Metal Gear Solid
 Johnny, the lead character in the film The Room
 Johnny, a Nomu character in the manga and anime series My Hero Academia
 Johnny 5, the robot star of the Short Circuit films
 Ghost Rider (Johnny Blaze), alternate identity of Ghost Rider, a comic book character
 The title character of Johnny Bravo, an American cartoon series
 Johnny C., the title character of Johnny the Homicidal Maniac, a comic book by Jhonen Vasquez
 Johnny Cade, in S. E. Hinton's 1967 novel The Outsiders and the 1983 film of the same name
 Johnny Cage, from the Mortal Kombat video game series
 Johnny Castle, a lead character in the 1980s film Dirty Dancing
 Johnny Connor, in the British television series Coronation Street
 Johnny Crowder, in the television series Justified
 Johnny Dangerously - Slapstick Mafia Comedy [Starring Michael Keaton]
 The title character of the films Johnny English (2003) and Johnny English Reborn (2011), played by Rowan Atkinson
 Johnny Fedora, in the Make Mine Music short Johnny Fedora and Alice Blue Bonnet
 Johnny Fiama, on The Muppet Show
 The title character of the film Johnny Guitar
 Johnny Joestar, the lead character of Hirohiko Araki's manga series Steel Ball Run
 Johnny Kapahaala, the lead character from the Disney Channel television film Johnny Tsunami
 Johnny Klebitz, the main character from the video game Grand Theft Auto IV: The Lost And Damned
 Johnny Lawrence, in the film The Karate Kid and the Netflix series Cobra Kai
 Johnny Mnemonic, the title character of a book by William Gibson and of the film based on the book
 Johnny Punk, an animatronic sold by Spirit Halloween for the 2020 Halloween season
 Johnny Silverhand, in the video game Cyberpunk 2077
 Johnny Snowman, a friend of Daisy in the Nick Jr. series Oswald
 "Johnny" Storm, the Human Torch of the Fantastic Four
  Johnny Teitelbaum [Shock-Jock from the Movie: The Adventures of Ford Fairlaine, Rock n Roll Detective]
 The title character of Johnny Test, a Canadian cartoon series
 Johnny Tightlips, a mafia member in the FOX animated television series The Simpsons
 Johnny Utah, lead character in Point Break
Johnny J. Worthington III, in the Pixar media franchise Monsters, Inc.

See also
 Alternate forms for the name John
Johnny (disambiguation)
 Jonnie
 Jonny
 Jhonny (disambiguation)
 Seonaidh, a water spirit on Lewis, Outer Hebrides in Scotland, UK

References

English masculine given names
English feminine given names
English-language feminine given names
English-language masculine given names
Hypocorisms